Abdul Qadir Al Rassam, عبد القادر الرسام), 1952 - 1882), was born in Baghdad, Ottoman Empire. He was one of the first generation of Iraqi artists to study abroad and paint in the European style. He was influential in terms of introducing local audiences to European art. He is noted for his portraits and landscapes, painted in the Realist style.

Life and career
Abdul Qadir Al Rassam was born in the Maysan Province, Qal'at Saleh District in 1882. Qadir's life straddled two distinct eras in Iraqi history: he was born during Ottoman rule and died in the royal era (1921-1958). He was the first well-known painter in modern Iraq and the leader of realism school in Iraq.

He studied military science and at the Military College, Istanbul, Turkey, (then the capital of the Ottoman Empire) from 1904, where drawing and painting were part of the curriculum. There, he was exposed to the European traditional style and learned to paint in the naive manner of the Turkish soldiers. Along with contemporaries, Salim Mohammed Saleh Zaki (1888-1974) and Hajj Mohammed Salim (1883-1941) who was a relative; all of whom also studied at the Military Academy, this group of Iraqi artists were first generation to paint in the European style. This group became known as the Ottomon artists.

During his military career, he was stationed in Istanbul. However, after retiring in the 1920s, he returned to Baghdad. His wife and family, however refused to leave Istanbul, forcing the artist to live alone in a house in Baghdad. Carpet Ghazi recalled visiting the artist with his father in the 1930s:

Along with artists, Mohammed Hajji Selim (1883-1941), Asim Hafidh (1886-1978) and Mohammed Saleh Zaki (1888-1974), he formed part of a small group of Iraqi artists modern Iraqi artists to take up easel painting and generally work in the European style. This group of painters became known as the Ottoman artists and were largely responsible for stimulating an interest in Western art amongst the Iraqi population, which in turn, inspired the next generation of modern Iraqi artists. Many of Iraq's modern artists began their careers by taking lessons with one of the Ottoman group of artists.

He was the first local artist to offer painting lessons in his studio, and many modern Iraqi painters began their careers by studying with him. He became a major figure among the first generation of modern Iraqi artists and was a founding member of the Art Friends Society (AFS, Jami’yat Asdiqa’ al-Fen).

He was primarily a landscape painter, and painted many landscapes of Iraq in the realism style, using shading and composition to suggest time periods. A prolific painter of oils, the majority of his works are now in private hands. A small collection of his work is hung in The Pioneers Museum, Baghdad, but many of these works were looted in 2003. He was also the first modern Iraqi artist to paint a mural in a public building - at the entrance to the Cinema Royal in Baghdad.

Very little is known about his early life and career. It was only when the researcher and art historian, Jabra Ibrahim Jabra investigated the history of art education in the city of Amarah 1917-1958 that his name was found in the Register of Teachers in the school of Qal'at Saleh for 1916.

Work
He painted scenes of everyday life in Iraq and landscapes, especially of area around the Tigris and Euphrates Rivers. A collection of his work is in The Pioneers Museum, Baghdad.

Select list of paintings
 A Military Encampment on the Banks of the Euphrates, 1936
 View of Baghdad, date unknown

See also

 Iraqi art
 Islamic art
 List of Iraqi artists
 List of painters

References

Parts of this article have been translated from associated  article on the Arabic Wikipedia.

External links
Abdul Qadir Al Rassam
Dijla at Sunset*
 *Modern Art Archive – reproductions of artworks many of which were destroyed or looted in 2003 and cannot be found in any other collection

1882 births
1952 deaths
20th-century Iraqi painters
Artists from Baghdad
Realist artists